Abies fargesii is a species of fir, a coniferous tree in the family Pinaceae. Its common name is Farges' fir, after the French missionary, botanist and plant collector, Paul Guillaume Farges. It is endemic to central China where it is found in Gansu, Henan, Hubei, Shaanxi, and Sichuan provinces. It grows in mountains and river basins at altitudes between  ASL.

Abies fargesii is a timber tree used in construction and for pulp.

The Latin specific epithet fargesii refers to the French missionary and amateur botanist Père Paul Guillaume Farges (1844–1912).

Varieties:
 Abies fargesii var. sutchuenensis Franch. (synonym: Abies sutchuenensis (Franch.) Rehder & E.H.Wilson)

Gallery

References

fargesii
Least concern plants
Trees of China
Endemic flora of China
Plants described in 1899
Taxonomy articles created by Polbot